Parliamentary elections were held in Burkina Faso on 5 May 2002. The result was a victory for the ruling Congress for Democracy and Progress (CDP), which won and 57 of the 111 seats in the National Assembly.

Electoral system
Following electoral reforms introduced since the 1997 elections, the 111 members of the National Assembly were elected in two sections; 90 seats were elected using regional lists in 13 constituencies, whilst the remaining 21 were elected on a national list.

Campaign
A total of 3,540 candidates registered to contest the elections, with 30 political parties participating.

Results

Aftermath
Following the elections, Roch Marc Christian Kaboré of the CDP was elected President of the National Assembly, defeating Marlène Zebango of the Alliance for Democracy and Federation – African Democratic Rally by a vote of 77–22.

References

Elections in Burkina Faso
Burkina Faso
2002 in Burkina Faso
Election and referendum articles with incomplete results
May 2002 events in Africa